Golijeh (also Romanized as Golījeh and Gollījeh; also known as Goljeh, Gullejeh, Gulludzhekh, and Kollījeh) is a village in Golabar Rural District, in the Central District of Ijrud County, Zanjan Province, Iran. At the 2006 census, its population was 34, in 7 families.

References 

Populated places in Ijrud County